CTQ may refer to:

 CTK – CiTylinK (ICAO: CTQ), in Accra, Ghana
 CTQ Tree (critical-to-quality tree), used in Six Sigma methodology
Concordia Theological Quarterly
 31 Digital in Brisbane, Australia, had the callsign CTQ-31 before the analogue shutdown then it had the callsign CTQ-32 until it’s closedown in 2017